A by-election was held for the Australian House of Representatives seat of Grey on 1 June 1963. This was triggered by the death of Labor MP Edgar Russell.

The by-election was won by Labor candidate Jack Mortimer.

Results

References

1963 elections in Australia
South Australian federal by-elections
June 1963 events in Australia